Christian Planer (born 15 May 1975) is an Austrian sport shooter. He competed at the 2004, 2008 and 2012 Olympics in two individual events, 10 m air rifle and 50 m small-bore rifle, and won a bronze medal in the small-bore rifle in 2004.

Records

References

1975 births
Living people
People from Kufstein
Austrian male sport shooters
Olympic shooters of Austria
Olympic bronze medalists for Austria
Shooters at the 2004 Summer Olympics
Shooters at the 2008 Summer Olympics
Shooters at the 2012 Summer Olympics
Medalists at the 2004 Summer Olympics
Olympic medalists in shooting
Sportspeople from Tyrol (state)
21st-century Austrian people